The Temple Owls men's basketball team represents Temple University in the sport of basketball. The Owls compete in National Collegiate Athletic Association (NCAA) Division I as a member of the American Athletic Conference (The American).  They play their home games in the Liacouras Center on the university's main campus in Philadelphia, Pennsylvania, and are currently led by head coach Aaron Mckie. Temple is the fifth-most winningest NCAA Division I men's college basketball program of all time, with 1,978 wins at the end of the 2022–23 season. Although they have reached the NCAA Tournament over thirty times, they are one of nine programs with that many appearances to have not won the Tournament and one of four to have never reached the National Championship Game.

On March 7, 2012, the Temple Owls announced that they would be rejoining the Big East Conference for all sports in 2013 after 31 years in the Atlantic 10 Conference, with the Owls football team membership beginning in the 2012 season. However, before Temple became an all-sports member of the Big East, the conference split along football lines. The league's non-FBS football schools formed a new Big East in 2013, while Temple and the remaining football members remained in the old conference, but renamed it the American Athletic Conference.

History

The Temple Owls became the first National Invitation Tournament (NIT) champions in 1938, one year before the inception of the NCAA Tournament. The NIT was broadly recognized as a National Championship awarding tournament for a number of years, beginning with the 1938 National Championship by Temple. Additionally, the Owls were retroactively recognized by the Premo-Porretta Power Poll and the Helms Athletic Foundation as the national champion for the 1937–38 season. Temple again won the NIT championship in 1969.

During the 1950s, the Temple basketball team made two NCAA Final Four appearances in (1956, 1958) under head coach Harry Litwack. Litwack was inducted into the Basketball Hall of Fame after concluding a 21-year coaching career that included 373 wins.

Head Coach John Chaney, also a Hall of Famer, won a total of 741 career games (312 losses) and took Temple to the NCAA tournament 17 times in 24 seasons with the Owls. His teams won the Atlantic 10 regular season championship eight times, while winning the A-10 Tournament six times. His 1987–88 Owls team entered the NCAA tournament ranked No. 1 in the country, but lost in the Elite Eight to Duke. Chaney reached the Elite Eight on five occasions and was the consensus National Coach of the Year in 1988. On March 13, 2006, Chaney retired from coaching.

On April 10, 2006, Penn head coach and La Salle alumnus Fran Dunphy was named the new head coach. Dunphy had coached the Quakers for 17 straight seasons prior to the move. After struggling his first year, the Owls won the A-10 Tournament for three consecutive years in 2008, 2009, and 2010. The Owls received bids to the NCAA Tournament for six straight years under Dunphy (2008–2013). However, the Owls only won a game in the Tournament twice during that time period. Since Temple joined the American Athletic Conference in 2013, the Owls have struggled, making the NCAA Tournament only in 2016 and 2019.

After the 2018 season it was announced that former Owls standout and then-assistant coach Aaron McKie would take over for Dunphy in 2019. 

Players Mark Macon, Juan Ignacio Sanchez, Eddie Jones, Lavoy Allen, Aaron McKie, Tim Perry and Mardy Collins are just a few who have gone on to play in the NBA.

Rivalries
As a member of the Big 5, the five large colleges in Philadelphia, the Owls have long-standing rivalries with Villanova, Penn, Saint Joseph's, and La Salle. The Owls are tied with Villanova for the most Big 5 titles to date, with 27. However, while tied in overall titles, Villanova has more outright titles not shared by any other tying team. The Owls have not won an outright Big 5 title since the 2000–01 season. The Owls won their most recent Big 5 title in 2022-23, going 3–1 in Big 5 play and splitting the title with Villanova. During Big 5 games, the Temple student section unfurls long banners about the opposing team, which has been a Big 5 trademark for Temple.

Other rivals include UMass, UConn, and Cincinnati. Temple was in the American Athletic Conference with UConn and Cincinnati until their departures in 2020 and 2023, respectively. When Temple was in the A-10, head coach John Chaney had a personal rivalry with UMass head coach John Calipari.

Awards and honors

Retired numbers

National Awards

All Americans
Mike Bloom – 1938
Bill Mlkvy – 1951
Guy Rodgers – 1957, 1958
Bill Kennedy – 1960
Terrence Stansbury – 1984
Nate Blackwell – 1987
Mark Macon – 1988
Pepe Sanchez – 2000

National Coach of the Year 
John Chaney – 1987, 1988

Conference awards

Atlantic 10 Conference (1982–2013) 
Atlantic 10 Player of the Year 
Terrence Stansbury – 1983–84
Granger Hall – 1984–85
Nate Blackwell – 1986–87
Tim Perry – 1987–88
Mark Macon – 1988–89
Aaron McKie – 1992–93
Eddie Jones – 1993–94
Marc Jackson – 1996–97
Pepe Sanchez – 1999–00
Khalif Wyatt – 2012–13

Atlantic 10 Sixth Man of the Year
Quincy Wadley – 1998–99
Lynn Greer – 1999–00
Brian Polk – 2001–02
Ramone Moore – 2009–10
Khalif Wyatt – 2010–11

Atlantic 10 Most Improved Player
Dionte Christmas – 2006–07
Scootie Randall – 2010–11

Atlantic 10 Coach of the Year 
John Chaney – 1983–84, 1984–85, 1986–87, 1987–88, 1999–00
Fran Dunphy – 2009–10, 2011–12

American Athletic Conference (2013–Present) 

American Athletic Conference Most Improved Player
Nate Pierre-Louis – 2019

American Athletic Conference Coach of the Year 
Fran Dunphy – 2015, 2016

Naismith Memorial Basketball Hall of Fame 
Harry Litwack – 1976
John Chaney – 2001
Guy Rodgers – 2014

Owls in pro basketball

NBA Drafted players

Postseason

NCAA tournament results
The Owls have appeared in the NCAA tournament 33 times. Their combined record is 33–33.

NIT results
The Owls have appeared in the National Invitation Tournament (NIT) 19 times. Their combined record is 23–17. They are two time NIT champions (1938, 1969).

References

 
Basketball teams established in 1895
1895 establishments in Pennsylvania